Kenneth "Harry" Oldmeadow (born 1947) is an Australian academic, author, editor and educator whose works focus on religion, tradition, traditionalist writers and philosophy.

Life and career

Oldmeadow was born in Melbourne in 1947. His parents were Christian missionaries in India and he spent the first nine years of his childhood there and developed an early interest in the civilisations of the East.

Oldmeadow studied history, politics and literature at the Australian National University, graduating in 1968 with First Class Honours in History, and the University of Sydney, as well as working as a history tutor at La Trobe University in Melbourne. In 1971 a Commonwealth Overseas Research Scholarship allowed him to study at the University of Oxford, followed by extensive travel in Europe and North Africa.

In 1980 he achieved a master's degree in religious studies at the University of Sydney where he completed a dissertation on the work of Frithjof Schuon and the other principal traditionalist writers. This study was awarded the University of Sydney Medal for excellence in research and was eventually published by the Sri Lanka Institute of Traditional Studies under the title Traditionalism: Religion in the Light of the Perennial Philosophy (Colombo, 2000). Under the auspices of this institute, Oldmeadow delivered the Inaugural Ananda Coomaraswamy Memorial Lecture in Colombo on "The Religious Tradition of the Australian Aborigines".

Oldmeadow was the Co-ordinator of Philosophy and Religious Studies at La Trobe University, Bendigo. He has published extensively in such journals as Sacred Web (Vancouver), Sophia (Washington DC) and Asian Philosophy (Nottingham, UK). In late 2001, he was a key speaker at a large interfaith gathering in Sydney organised by the Australian Centre for Sufism; the theme of the meeting was the need for interreligious understanding in the wake of the 11 September 2001 attacks.

Bibliography

Books

The Betrayal of Tradition (Bloomington: World Wisdom, 2003) 
 
 (Editor), 
 
 
 
  
 Occultism & Religion: in Freud, Jung and Mircea Eliade (in Portuguese. Co-authored with Mateus Soares de Azevedo). São Paulo: Ibrasa, 2011. 
 
Articles
Luther's Affirmation, St Mark's Review, No. 52, May 1968 
Petrarch and Dr. Leavis: A Perspective on Literature and Society, ANU Historical Journal, No 6, Nov 1969 
Traditional and Modern Attitudes to Religious Biography, Religious Traditions, VII-IX 1986 
”The Religious Tradition of the Australian Aborigines, Sri Lanka Institute of Traditional Studies, 1990 
The Religious Tradition of the Australian Aborigines in A. Sharma (ed) Fragments of Infinity: Essays in Philosophy and Religion, Prism Press, 1991 
Disowning the Past: the Political and Postmodernist Assault on the Humanities, Quadrant, March 1992 
Sankara's Doctrine of Maya, Asian Philosophy 2:2, 1992 
The Life and Work of René Guénon introduction to R. Guénon's Reign of Quantity, Sophia Perennis et Universalis, 1995 
Modern Science and the Destruction of Traditional Understandings, Australian Orthodontic Journal 14:3, October 1996 
Tracking The Searchers: A survey of its critical reception, Continuum, 11:2 1997
Delivering the last blade of grass': Aspects of the Bodhisattva Ideal in the Mahayana, Asian Philosophy, 1997 *"Metaphysics, Theology and Philosophy", Sacred Web I, 1998 
A Sage for the Times: the Role and Oeuvre of Frithjof Schuon, Sophia, 1998 
The Translucence of the Eternal': Religious Understandings of the Natural Order, Sacred Web 2, 1998 
To a Buddhist Beat: Allen Ginsberg on Poetics, Politics and Spirituality, Beyond the Divide 3, 1999
The Role of Mystical Traditions in the Contemporary World, The Treasure: Australia's Sufi Magazine, Issue No. 8, 2000 
Formal Diversity, Inner Unity, Sacred Web, 2000 
The Not-so-Close Encounters of Western Psychology & Eastern Spirituality (The Animist, 2000) 
Melodies from the Beyond: Aboriginal Religion in Schuonian Perspective (Connaissance des religions, 2001) 
'Signs of the Supra-Sensible': Frithjof Schuon on the Natural Order (Sacred Web, 2001) 
Seeing God Everywhere: Essays on Nature and the Sacred (Bloomington: World Wisdom, 2003)

References

External links
 Staff Page at La Trobe University (archived)
 "The Western Quest for Secret Tibet" (article)
 "Tradition Betrayed: The False Prophets of Modernism") (speech)
 Audio interview with Oldmeadow

1947 births
Academic staff of La Trobe University
Living people
Religion academics
Religious studies scholars
Traditionalist School